Cattle (Bos taurus) are large, domesticated, cloven-hooved, herbivores. They are a prominent modern member of the subfamily Bovinae and the most widespread species of the genus Bos. Adult females are referred to as cows and adult males are referred to as bulls.

Cattle are commonly raised as livestock for meat (beef or veal, see beef cattle), for milk (see dairy cattle), and for hides, which are used to make leather. They are used as riding animals and draft animals (oxen or bullocks, which pull carts, plows and other implements). Another product of cattle is their dung, which can be used to create manure or fuel. In some regions, such as parts of India, cattle have significant religious significance. Cattle, mostly small breeds such as the Miniature Zebu, are also kept as pets.

Different types of cattle are common to different geographic areas. Taurine cattle are found primarily in Europe and temperate areas of Asia, the Americas, and Australia. Zebus (also called indicine cattle) are found primarily in India and tropical areas of Asia, America, and Australia. Sanga cattle are found primarily in sub-Saharan Africa. These types (which are sometimes classified as separate species or subspecies) are further divided into over 1,000 recognized breeds.

Around 10,500 years ago, taurine cattle were domesticated from as few as 80 wild aurochs progenitors in central Anatolia, the Levant and Western Iran. A separate domestication event occurred in the Indian subcontinent, which gave rise to zebu. According to the Food and Agriculture Organization (FAO), there are approximately 1.5 billion cattle in the world as of 2018. Cattle are the main source of greenhouse gas emissions from livestock, and are responsible for around 10% of global greenhouse gas emissions. In 2009, cattle became one of the first livestock animals to have a fully mapped genome.

Taxonomy

Cattle were originally identified as three separate species: Bos taurus, the European or "taurine" cattle (including similar types from Africa and Asia); Bos indicus, the Indicine or "zebu"; and the extinct Bos primigenius, the aurochs. The aurochs is ancestral to both zebu and taurine cattle. They were later reclassified as one species, Bos taurus, with the aurochs, zebu, and taurine cattle as subspecies. However, this taxonomy is contentious and some sources prefer the separate species classification, such as the American Society of Mammalogists' Mammal Diversity Database.

Complicating the matter is the ability of cattle to interbreed with other closely related species. Hybrid individuals and even breeds exist, not only between taurine cattle and zebu (such as the sanga cattle (Bos taurus africanus x Bos indicus), but also between one or both of these and some other members of the genus Bosyaks (the dzo or yattle), banteng, and gaur. Hybrids such as the beefalo breed can even occur between taurine cattle and either species of bison, leading some authors to consider them part of the genus Bos, as well. The hybrid origin of some types may not be obvious – for example, genetic testing of the Dwarf Lulu breed, the only taurine-type cattle in Nepal, found them to be a mix of taurine cattle, zebu, and yak. However, cattle cannot be successfully hybridized with more distantly related bovines such as water buffalo or African buffalo.

The aurochs originally ranged throughout Europe, North Africa, and much of Asia. In historical times, its range became restricted to Europe, and the last known individual died in Mazovia, Poland, in about 1627. Breeders have attempted to recreate cattle of similar appearance to aurochs by crossing traditional types of domesticated cattle, creating the Heck cattle breed.

The only pure African taurine breeds (Bos taurus africanus) remaining are the N'Dama, Kuri and some varieties of the West African Shorthorn.

Etymology
Cattle did not originate as the term for bovine animals. It was borrowed from Anglo-Norman , itself from medieval Latin  'principal sum of money, capital', itself derived in turn from Latin  'head'. Cattle originally meant movable personal property, especially livestock of any kind, as opposed to real property (the land, which also included wild or small free-roaming animals such as chickens—they were sold as part of the land). The word is a variant of chattel (a unit of personal property) and closely related to capital in the economic sense. The term replaced earlier Old English  'cattle, property', which survives today as fee (cf. ,).

The word cow came via Anglo-Saxon  (plural ), from Common Indo-European  (genitive ) 'a bovine animal', cf. This is the origin of the now archaic English plural, kine.

In older English sources such as the King James Version of the Bible, cattle refers to livestock, as opposed to deer which refers to wildlife. Wild cattle may refer to feral cattle or to undomesticated species of the genus Bos. Today, when used without any other qualifier, the modern meaning of cattle is usually restricted to domesticated bovines.

Terminology

In general, the same words are used in different parts of the world, but with minor differences in the definitions. The terminology described here contrasts the differences in definition between the United Kingdom and other British-influenced parts of the world such as Canada, Australia, New Zealand, Ireland and the United States.
 An "intact" (i.e., not castrated) adult male is called a bull.
 A father bull is called a sire with reference to his offspring.
 An adult female that has had a calf (or two, depending on regional usage) is a cow.
 A mother cow is called a dam with reference to her offspring. Often, mentions of dams imply cows kept in the herd for repeated breeding (as opposed to heifers or cows sold off sooner).
 A young female before she has had a calf of her own and who is under three years of age is called a heifer. A young female that has had only one calf is occasionally called a first-calf heifer. Heiferettes are either first-calf heifers or a subset thereof without potential to become lineage dams, depending on whose definition is operative.
 Young cattle (regardless of sex) are called calves until they are weaned, then weaners until they are a year old in some areas; in other areas, particularly with male beef cattle, they may be known as feeder calves or feeders. After that, they are referred to as yearlings or stirks if between one and two years of age.
 Feeder cattle or store cattle are young cattle soon to be either backgrounded or sent to fattening, most especially those intended to be sold to someone else for finishing. In some regions, a distinction between stockers and feeders (by those names) is the distinction of backgrounding versus immediate sale to a finisher.
 A castrated male is called a steer in the United States; older steers are often called bullocks in other parts of the world, but in North America this term refers to a young bull. Piker bullocks are micky bulls (uncastrated young male bulls) that were caught, castrated and then later lost. In Australia, the term Japanese ox is used for grain-fed steers in the weight range of 500 to 650 kg that are destined for the Japanese meat trade. In North America, draft cattle under four years old are called working steers. Improper or late castration on a bull results in it becoming a coarse steer known as a stag in Australia, Canada and New Zealand. In some countries, an incompletely castrated male is known also as a rig.
 A castrated male (occasionally a female or in some areas a bull) kept for draft or riding purposes is called an ox (plural oxen); ox may also be used to refer to some carcass products from any adult cattle, such as ox-hide, ox-blood, oxtail, or ox-liver.
 A springer is a cow or heifer close to calving.
 In all cattle species, a female twin of a bull usually becomes an infertile partial intersex, and is called a freemartin.
 A wild, young, unmarked bull is known as a micky in Australia.
 An unbranded bovine of either sex is called a maverick in the US and Canada.
 Neat (horned oxen, from which neatsfoot oil is derived), beef (young ox) and beefing (young animal fit for slaughtering) are obsolete terms, although poll, pollard and polled cattle are still terms in use for naturally hornless animals, or in some areas also for those that have been disbudded or dehorned.
 Cattle raised for human consumption are called beef cattle. Within the American beef cattle industry, the older term beef (plural beeves) is still used to refer to an animal of either sex. Some Australian, Canadian, New Zealand and British people use the term beast.
 Cattle bred specifically for milk production are called milking or dairy cattle; a cow kept to provide milk for one family may be called a house cow or milker. A fresh cow is a dairy term for a cow or first-calf heifer who has recently given birth, or "freshened."
 The adjective applying to cattle in general is usually bovine. The terms bull, cow and calf are also used by extension to denote the sex or age of other large animals, including whales, hippopotamuses, camels, elk and elephants.
 Various other terms for cattle or types thereof are historical; these include nowt, nolt, mart, and others.

Singular terminology issue

"Cattle" can only be used in the plural and not in the singular: it is a plurale tantum. Thus one may refer to "three cattle" or "some cattle", but not "one cattle". "One head of cattle" is a valid though periphrastic way to refer to one animal of indeterminate or unknown age and sex; otherwise no universally used single-word singular form of cattle exists in modern English, other than the sex- and age-specific terms such as cow, bull, steer and heifer. Historically, "ox" was not a sex-specific term for adult cattle, but generally this is now used only for working cattle, especially adult castrated males. The term is also incorporated into the names of other species, such as the musk ox and "grunting ox" (yak), and is used in some areas to describe certain cattle products such as ox-hide and oxtail.

Cow is in general use as a singular for the collective cattle. The word cow is easy to use when a singular is needed and the sex is unknown or irrelevant—when "there is a cow in the road", for example. Further, any herd of fully mature cattle in or near a pasture is statistically likely to consist mostly of cows, so the term is probably accurate even in the restrictive sense. Other than the few bulls needed for breeding, the vast majority of male cattle are castrated as calves and are used as oxen or slaughtered for meat before the age of three years. Thus, in a pastured herd, any calves or herd bulls usually are clearly distinguishable from the cows due to distinctively different sizes and clear anatomical differences. Merriam-Webster and Oxford Living Dictionaries recognize the sex-nonspecific use of cow as an alternate definition, whereas Collins and the OED do not.

Colloquially, more general nonspecific terms may denote cattle when a singular form is needed. Head of cattle is usually used only after a numeral. Australian, New Zealand and British farmers use the term beast or cattle beast. Bovine is also used in Britain. The term critter is common in the western United States and Canada, particularly when referring to young cattle. In some areas of the American South (particularly the Appalachian region), where both dairy and beef cattle are present, an individual animal was once called a "beef critter", though that term is becoming archaic.

Other terminology
Cattle raised for human consumption are called beef cattle. Within the beef cattle industry in parts of the United States, the term beef (plural beeves) is still used in its archaic sense to refer to an animal of either sex. Cows of certain breeds that are kept for the milk they give are called dairy cows or milking cows (formerly milch cows). Most young male offspring of dairy cows are sold for veal, and may be referred to as veal calves.

The term dogies is used to describe orphaned calves in the context of ranch work in the American West, as in "Keep them dogies moving". In some places, a cow kept to provide milk for one family is called a "house cow". Other obsolete terms for cattle include "neat" (this use survives in "neatsfoot oil", extracted from the feet and legs of cattle), and "beefing" (young animal fit for slaughter).

An onomatopoeic term for one of the most common sounds made by cattle is moo (also called lowing). There are a number of other sounds made by cattle, including calves bawling, and bulls bellowing. Bawling is most common for cows after weaning of a calf. The bullroarer makes a sound similar to a bull's territorial call.

Characteristics

Anatomy

Cattle are large quadrupedal ungulate mammals with cloven hooves. Most breeds have horns, which can be as large as the Texas Longhorn or small like a scur. Careful genetic selection has allowed polled (hornless) cattle to become widespread.

Digestive system

Cattle are ruminants, meaning their digestive system is highly specialized to allow the consumption of difficult to digest plants as food. Cattle have one stomach with four compartments, the rumen, reticulum, omasum, and abomasum, with the rumen being the largest compartment.
The reticulum, the smallest compartment, is known as the "honeycomb". The omasum's main function is to absorb water and nutrients from the digestible feed. The omasum is known as the "many plies". The abomasum is like the human stomach; this is why it is known as the "true stomach".

Cattle are known for regurgitating and re-chewing their food, known as cud chewing, like most ruminants. While the animal is feeding, the food is swallowed without being chewed and goes into the rumen for storage until the animal can find a quiet place to continue the digestion process. The food is regurgitated, a mouthful at a time, back up to the mouth, where the food, now called the cud, is chewed by the molars, grinding down the coarse vegetation to small particles. The cud is then swallowed again and further digested by specialized microorganisms in the rumen. These microbes are primarily responsible for decomposing cellulose and other carbohydrates into volatile fatty acids cattle use as their primary metabolic fuel. The microbes inside the rumen also synthesize amino acids from non-protein nitrogenous sources, such as urea and ammonia. As these microbes reproduce in the rumen, older generations die and their cells continue on through the digestive tract. These cells are then partially digested in the small intestines, allowing cattle to gain a high-quality protein source. These features allow cattle to thrive on grasses and other tough vegetation.

Gestation and size
The gestation period for a cow is about nine months long. A newborn calf's size can vary among breeds, but a typical calf weighs . Adult size and weight vary significantly among breeds and sex. Steers are generally slaughtered before reaching . Breeding stock may be allowed a longer lifespan, occasionally living as long as 25 years. The oldest recorded cow, Big Bertha, died at the age of 48 in 1993.

Reproduction

On farms it is very common to use artificial insemination (AI), a medically assisted reproduction technique consisting of the artificial deposition of semen in the female's genital tract. It is used in cases where the spermatozoa can not reach the fallopian tubes or by choice of the owner of the animal. It consists of transferring, to the uterine cavity, spermatozoa previously collected and processed, with the selection of morphologically more normal and mobile spermatozoa.

A cow's udder contains two pairs of mammary glands, (commonly referred to as teats) creating four "quarters". The front ones are referred to as fore quarters and the rear ones rear quarters.

Synchronization of cattle ovulation to benefit dairy farming may be accomplished via induced ovulation techniques.

The secondary sex ratio – the ratio of male to female offspring at birth – is approximately 52:48, although it may be influenced by environmental and other factors.

Bulls become fertile at about seven months of age.

A bull has a fibro-elastic penis. Given the small amount of erectile tissue, there is little enlargement after erection. The penis is quite rigid when non-erect, and becomes even more rigid during erection. Protrusion is not affected much by erection, but more by relaxation of the retractor penis muscle and straightening of the sigmoid flexure.

Weight

The weight of adult cattle varies, depending on the breed. Bulls are larger than cows of the same breed by up to a few hundred kilograms. British Hereford cows weigh ; the bulls weigh .

In the United States, the average weight of beef cattle has steadily increased, especially since the 1970s, requiring the building of new slaughterhouses able to handle larger carcasses. New packing plants in the 1980s stimulated a large increase in cattle weights. Before 1790 beef cattle averaged only  net; and thereafter weights climbed steadily.

Cognition
In laboratory studies, young cattle are able to memorize the locations of several food sources and retain this memory for at least 8 hours, although this declined after 12 hours. Fifteen-month-old heifers learn more quickly than adult cows which have had either one or two calvings, but their longer-term memory is less stable. Mature cattle perform well in spatial learning tasks and have a good long-term memory in these tests. Cattle tested in a radial arm maze are able to remember the locations of high-quality food for at least 30 days. Although they initially learn to avoid low-quality food, this memory diminishes over the same duration. Under less artificial testing conditions, young cattle showed they were able to remember the location of feed for at least 48 days. Cattle can make an association between a visual stimulus and food within 1 day—memory of this association can be retained for 1 year, despite a slight decay.

Calves are capable of discrimination learning and adult cattle compare favourably with small mammals in their learning ability in the closed-field test.

They are also able to discriminate between familiar individuals, and among humans. Cattle can tell the difference between familiar and unfamiliar animals of the same species (conspecifics). Studies show they behave less aggressively toward familiar individuals when they are forming a new group. Calves can also discriminate between humans based on previous experience, as shown by approaching those who handled them positively and avoiding those who handled them aversively. Although cattle can discriminate between humans by their faces alone, they also use other cues such as the color of clothes when these are available.

In audio play-back studies, calves prefer their own mother's vocalizations compared to the vocalizations of an unfamiliar mother.

In laboratory studies using images, cattle can discriminate between images of the heads of cattle and other animal species. They are also able to distinguish between familiar and unfamiliar conspecifics. Furthermore, they are able to categorize images as familiar and unfamiliar individuals.

When mixed with other individuals, cloned calves from the same donor form subgroups, indicating that kin discrimination occurs and may be a basis of grouping behaviour. It has also been shown using images of cattle that both artificially inseminated and cloned calves have similar cognitive capacities of kin and non-kin discrimination.

Cattle can recognize familiar individuals. Visual individual recognition is a more complex mental process than visual discrimination. It requires the recollection of the learned idiosyncratic identity of an individual that has been previously encountered and the formation of a mental representation. By using two-dimensional images of the heads of one cow (face, profiles,  views), all the tested heifers showed individual recognition of familiar and unfamiliar individuals from their own breed. Furthermore, almost all the heifers recognized unknown individuals from different breeds, although this was achieved with greater difficulty. Individual recognition was most difficult when the visual features of the breed being tested were quite different from the breed in the image, for example, the breed being tested had no spots whereas the image was of a spotted breed.

Cattle use visual/brain lateralisation in their visual scanning of novel and familiar stimuli. Domestic cattle prefer to view novel stimuli with the left eye, i.e. using the right brain hemisphere (similar to horses, Australian magpies, chicks, toads and fish) but use the right eye, i.e. using the left hemisphere, for viewing familiar stimuli.

Temperament and emotions

In cattle, temperament can affect production traits such as carcass and meat quality or milk yield as well as affecting the animal's overall health and reproduction. Cattle temperament is defined as "the consistent behavioral and physiological difference observed between individuals in response to a stressor or environmental challenge and is used to describe the relatively stable difference in the behavioral predisposition of an animal, which can be related to psychobiological mechanisms". Generally, cattle temperament is assumed to be multidimensional. Five underlying categories of temperament traits have been proposed:
 shyness–boldness
 exploration–avoidance
 activity
 aggressiveness
 sociability

In a study on Holstein–Friesian heifers learning to press a panel to open a gate for access to a food reward, the researchers also recorded the heart rate and behavior of the heifers when moving along the race towards the food. When the heifers made clear improvements in learning, they had higher heart rates and tended to move more vigorously along the race. The researchers concluded this was an indication that cattle may react emotionally to their own learning improvement.

Negative emotional states are associated with a bias toward negative responses towards ambiguous cues in judgement tasks. After separation from their mothers, Holstein calves showed such a cognitive bias indicative of low mood. A similar study showed that after hot-iron disbudding (dehorning), calves had a similar negative bias indicating that post-operative pain following this routine procedure results in a negative change in emotional state.

In studies of visual discrimination, the position of the ears has been used as an indicator of emotional state. When cattle are stressed other cattle can tell by the chemicals released in their urine.

Cattle are very gregarious and even short-term isolation is considered to cause severe psychological stress. When Aubrac and Friesian heifers are isolated, they increase their vocalizations and experience increased heart rate and plasma cortisol concentrations. These physiological changes are greater in Aubracs. When visual contact is re-instated, vocalizations rapidly decline, regardless of the familiarity of the returning cattle, however, heart rate decreases are greater if the returning cattle are familiar to the previously isolated individual. Mirrors have been used to reduce stress in isolated cattle.

Senses
Cattle use all of the five widely recognized sensory modalities. These can assist in some complex behavioural patterns, for example, in grazing behaviour. Cattle eat mixed diets, but when given the opportunity, show a partial preference of approximately 70% clover and 30% grass. This preference has a diurnal pattern, with a stronger preference for clover in the morning, and the proportion of grass increasing towards the evening.

Vision

Vision is the dominant sense in cattle and they obtain almost 50% of their information visually.

Cattle are a prey animal and to assist predator detection, their eyes are located on the sides of their head rather than the front. This gives them a wide field of view of 330° but limits binocular vision (and therefore stereopsis) to 30° to 50° compared to 140° in humans. This means they have a blind spot directly behind them. Cattle have good visual acuity, but compared to humans, their visual accommodation is poor.

Cattle have two kinds of color receptors in the cone cells of their retinas. This means that cattle are dichromatic, as are most other non-primate land mammals. There are two to three rods per cone in the fovea centralis but five to six near the optic papilla. Cattle can distinguish long wavelength colors (yellow, orange and red) much better than the shorter wavelengths (blue, grey and green). Calves are able to discriminate between long (red) and short (blue) or medium (green) wavelengths, but have limited ability to discriminate between the short and medium. They also approach handlers more quickly under red light. Whilst having good color sensitivity, it is not as good as humans or sheep.

A common misconception about cattle (particularly bulls) is that they are enraged by the color red (something provocative is often said to be "like a red flag to a bull"). This is a myth. In bullfighting, it is the movement of the red flag or cape that irritates the bull and incites it to charge.

Taste
Cattle have a well-developed sense of taste and can distinguish the four primary tastes (sweet, salty, bitter and sour). They possess around 20,000 taste buds. The strength of taste perception depends on the individual's current food requirements. They avoid bitter-tasting foods (potentially toxic) and have a marked preference for sweet (high calorific value) and salty foods (electrolyte balance). Their sensitivity to sour-tasting foods helps them to maintain optimal ruminal pH.

Plants have low levels of sodium and cattle have developed the capacity of seeking salt by taste and smell. If cattle become depleted of sodium salts, they show increased locomotion directed to searching for these. To assist in their search, the olfactory and gustatory receptors able to detect minute amounts of sodium salts increase their sensitivity as biochemical disruption develops with sodium salt depletion.

Hearing
Cattle hearing ranges from 23 Hz to 35 kHz. Their frequency of best sensitivity is 8 kHz and they have a lowest threshold of −21 db (re 20 μN/m−2), which means their hearing is more acute than horses (lowest threshold of 7 db). Sound localization acuity thresholds are an average of 30°. This means that cattle are less able to localise sounds compared to goats (18°), dogs (8°) and humans (0.8°). Because cattle have a broad foveal fields of view covering almost the entire horizon, they may not need very accurate locus information from their auditory systems to direct their gaze to a sound source.

Vocalizations are an important mode of communication amongst cattle and can provide information on the age, sex, dominance status and reproductive status of the caller. Calves can recognize their mothers using vocalizations; vocal behaviour may play a role by indicating estrus and competitive display by bulls.

Olfaction and gustation

Cattle have a range of odiferous glands over their body including interdigital, infraorbital, inguinal and sebaceous glands, indicating that olfaction probably plays a large role in their social life. Both the primary olfactory system using the olfactory bulbs, and the secondary olfactory system using the vomeronasal organ are used. This latter olfactory system is used in the flehmen response. There is evidence that when cattle are stressed, this can be recognised by other cattle and this is communicated by alarm substances in the urine. The odour of dog faeces induces behavioural changes prior to cattle feeding, whereas the odours of urine from either stressed or non-stressed conspecifics and blood have no effect.

In the laboratory, cattle can be trained to recognise conspecific individuals using olfaction only.

In general, cattle use their sense of smell to "expand" on information detected by other sensory modalities. However, in the case of social and reproductive behaviours, olfaction is a key source of information.

Touch
Cattle have tactile sensations detected mainly by mechanoreceptors, thermoreceptors and nociceptors in the skin and muscles. These are used most frequently when cattle explore their environment.

Magnetoreception
There is conflicting evidence for magnetoreception in cattle. One study reported that resting and grazing cattle tend to align their body axes in the geomagnetic north–south direction. In a follow-up study, cattle exposed to various magnetic fields directly beneath or in the vicinity of power lines trending in various magnetic directions exhibited distinct patterns of alignment. However, in 2011, a group of Czech researchers reported their failed attempt to replicate the finding using Google Earth images.

Behavior
Under natural conditions, calves stay with their mother until weaning at 8 to 11 months. Heifer and bull calves are equally attached to their mothers in the first few months of life. Cattle are considered to be "hider" type animals, utilizing secluded areas more in the hours before calving and continued to use it more for the hour after calving. Cows that gave birth for the first time show a higher incidence of abnormal maternal behavior.

In one study, beef-calves reared on the range were observed to suckle an average of 5.0 times every 24 hours with an average total time of 46 min spent suckling. There was a diurnal rhythm in suckling activity with peaks between 05:00–07:00, 10:00–13:00 and 17:00–21:00.

Reproductive behavior

Semi-wild Highland cattle heifers first give birth at 2 or 3 years of age, and the timing of birth is synchronized with increases in natural food quality. Average calving interval is 391 days, and calving mortality within the first year of life is 5%.

Dominance and leadership
One study showed that over a 4-year period, dominance relationships within a herd of semi-wild highland cattle were very firm. There were few overt aggressive conflicts and the majority of disputes were settled by agonistic (non-aggressive, competitive) behaviors that involved no physical contact between opponents (e.g. threatening and spontaneous withdrawing). Such agonistic behavior reduces the risk of injury. Dominance status depended on age and sex, with older animals generally being dominant to young ones and males dominant to females. Young bulls gained superior dominance status over adult cows when they reached about 2 years of age.

As with many animal dominance hierarchies, dominance-associated aggressiveness does not correlate with rank position, but is closely related to rank distance between individuals.

Dominance is maintained in several ways. Cattle often engage in mock fights where they test each other's strength in a non-aggressive way. Licking is primarily performed by subordinates and received by dominant animals. Mounting is a playful behavior shown by calves of both sexes and by bulls and sometimes by cows in estrus, however, this is not a dominance related behavior as has been found in other species.

The horns of cattle are "honest signals" used in mate selection. Furthermore, horned cattle attempt to keep greater distances between themselves and have fewer physical interactions than hornless cattle. This leads to more stable social relationships.

In calves, the frequency of agonistic behavior decreases as space allowance increases, but this does not occur for changes in group size. However, in adult cattle, the number of agonistic encounters increases as the group size increases.

Grazing behavior
When grazing, cattle vary several aspects of their bite, i.e. tongue and jaw movements, depending on characteristics of the plant they are eating. Bite area decreases with the density of the plants but increases with their height. Bite depth increases with the height of the plants. By adjusting their behavior, cattle obtain heavier bites in swards that are tall and sparse compared with short, dense swards of equal mass/area. Cattle adjust other aspects of their grazing behavior in relation to the available food; foraging velocity decreases and intake rate increases in areas of abundant palatable forage.

Cattle avoid grazing areas contaminated by the faeces of other cattle more strongly than they avoid areas contaminated by sheep, but they do not avoid pasture contaminated by rabbit faeces.

Genetics

On 24 April 2009, edition of the journal Science, a team of researchers led by the National Institutes of Health and the US Department of Agriculture reported having mapped the bovine genome. The scientists found cattle have about 22,000 genes, and 80% of their genes are shared with humans, and they share about 1000 genes with dogs and rodents, but are not found in humans. Using this bovine "HapMap", researchers can track the differences between the breeds that affect the quality of meat and milk yields.

Behavioral traits of cattle can be as heritable as some production traits, and often, the two can be related. The heritability of fear varies markedly in cattle from low (0.1) to high (0.53); such high variation is also found in pigs and sheep, probably due to differences in the methods used. The heritability of temperament (response to isolation during handling) has been calculated as 0.36 and 0.46 for habituation to handling. Rangeland assessments show that the heritability of aggressiveness in cattle is around 0.36.

Quantitative trait loci (QTLs) have been found for a range of production and behavioral characteristics for both dairy and beef cattle.

Domestication and husbandry

Cattle occupy a unique role in human history, having been domesticated since at least the early neolithic age.

Archaeozoological and genetic data indicate that cattle were first domesticated from wild aurochs (Bos primigenius) approximately 10,500 years ago. There were two major areas of domestication: one in the Near East (specifically central Anatolia, the Levant and Western Iran), giving rise to the taurine line, and a second in the area that is now Pakistan, resulting in the indicine line. Modern mitochondrial DNA variation indicates the taurine line may have arisen from as few as 80 aurochs tamed in the upper reaches of Mesopotamia near the villages of Çayönü Tepesi in what is now southeastern Turkey and Dja'de el-Mughara in what is now northern Syria.

Although European cattle are largely descended from the taurine lineage, gene flow from African cattle (partially of indicine origin) contributed substantial genomic components to both southern European cattle breeds and their New World descendants. A study on 134 breeds showed that modern taurine cattle originated from Africa, Asia, North and South America, Australia, and Europe. Some researchers have suggested that African taurine cattle are derived from a third independent domestication from North African aurochsen.

Usage as money
As early as 9000 BC both grain and cattle were used as money or as barter (the first grain remains found, considered to be evidence of pre-agricultural practice date to 17,000 BC). Some evidence also exists to suggest that other animals, such as camels and goats, may have been used as currency in some parts of the world. One of the advantages of using cattle as currency is that it allows the seller to set a fixed price. It even created the standard pricing. For example, two chickens were traded for one cow as cows were deemed to be more valuable than chickens.

Modern husbandry

Cattle are often raised by allowing herds to graze on the grasses of large tracts of rangeland. Raising cattle in this manner allows the use of land that might be unsuitable for growing crops. The most common interactions with cattle involve daily feeding, cleaning and milking. Many routine husbandry practices involve ear tagging, dehorning, loading, medical operations, artificial insemination, vaccinations and hoof care, as well as training for agricultural shows and preparations. Also, some cultural differences occur in working with cattle; the cattle husbandry of Fulani men rests on behavioural techniques, whereas in Europe, cattle are controlled primarily by physical means, such as fences. Breeders use cattle husbandry to reduce M. bovis infection susceptibility by selective breeding and maintaining herd health to avoid concurrent disease.

Cattle are farmed for beef, veal, dairy, and leather. They are less commonly used for conservation grazing, or to maintain grassland for wildlife, such as in Epping Forest, England. They are often used in some of the most wild places for livestock. Depending on the breed, cattle can survive on hill grazing, heaths, marshes, moors and semidesert. Modern cattle are more commercial than older breeds and, having become more specialized, are less versatile. For this reason, many smaller farmers still favor old breeds, such as the Jersey dairy breed.
In Portugal, Spain, southern France and some Latin American countries, bulls are used in the activity of bullfighting; In many other countries bullfighting is illegal. Other activities such as bull riding are seen as part of a rodeo, especially in North America. Bull-leaping, a central ritual in Bronze Age Minoan culture (see Sacred Bull), still exists in southwestern France. In modern times, cattle are also entered into agricultural competitions. These competitions can involve live cattle or cattle carcases in hoof and hook events.

In terms of food intake by humans, consumption of cattle is less efficient than of grain or vegetables with regard to land use, and hence cattle grazing consumes more area than such other agricultural production when raised on grains. Nonetheless, cattle and other forms of domesticated animals can sometimes help to use plant resources in areas not easily amenable to other forms of agriculture.

Bulls are sometimes used as guard animals. In occasional cases, cattle are kept as pets, and pet cows often have sweet temperaments, enjoying being petted and "kissing" (licking) their owners. But there are costs to keeping them as pets that limit how many people can practically do so; not everyone has space or facilities for a large-animal pet, and some amount of resources are needed to keep one humanely (such as pasture, hay, feed, water, and large-animal veterinary care). In addition, because livestock animals are gregarious, they need at least one companion to avoid being stressed or lonely, so keeping bovine, caprine, or ovine pets requires more than one animal. Most pet cows live on farms that have other livestock anyway, as the marginal cost of one or two more animals is then not very large. Farmers have traditionally often been averse to making pets out of livestock, on the principle that each animal must pay its way somehow if the farm is to survive financially, and also because there are sufficient opportunities for moments of petting and animal appreciation among the herd anyway, even when none of them are pets per se.

Sleep

The average sleep time of a domestic cow is about 4 hours a day. Cattle do have a stay apparatus, but do not sleep standing up; they lie down to sleep deeply. In spite of the urban legend, cows cannot be tipped over by people pushing on them.

Economy

The meat of adult cattle is known as beef, and that of calves is veal. Other animal parts are also used as food products, including blood, liver, kidney, heart and oxtail. Cattle also produce milk, and dairy cattle are specifically bred to produce the large quantities of milk processed and sold for human consumption. Cattle today are the basis of a multibillion-dollar industry worldwide. The international trade in beef for 2000 was over $30 billion and represented only 23% of world beef production. Approximately 300 million cattle, including dairy cattle, are slaughtered each year for food. The production of milk, which is also made into cheese, butter, yogurt, and other dairy products, is comparable in economic size to beef production, and provides an important part of the food supply for many of the world's people. Cattle hides, used for leather to make shoes, couches and clothing, are another widespread product. Cattle remain broadly used as draft animals in many developing countries, such as India. Cattle are also used in some sporting games, including rodeo and bullfighting.

Cattle meat production

Source: Helgi Library, World Bank, FAOSTAT

About a quarter of the world's meat comes from cattle.

Dairy

Certain breeds of cattle, such as the Holstein-Friesian, are used to produce milk, which can be processed into dairy products such as milk, cheese or yogurt. Dairy cattle are usually kept on specialized dairy farms designed for milk production. Most cows are milked twice per day, with milk processed at a dairy, which may be onsite at the farm or the milk may be shipped to a dairy plant for eventual sale of a dairy product. Lactation is induced in heifers and spayed cows by a combination of physical and psychological stimulation, by drugs, or by a combination of those methods. For mother cows to continue producing milk, they give birth to one calf per year. If the calf is male, it generally is slaughtered at a young age to produce veal. They will continue to produce milk until three weeks before birth. Over the last fifty years, dairy farming has become more intensive to increase the yield of milk produced by each cow. The Holstein-Friesian is the breed of dairy cow most common in the UK, Europe and the United States. It has been bred selectively to produce the highest yields of milk of any cow. Around 22 litres per day is average in the UK.

Hides
Most cattle are not kept solely for hides, which are usually a by-product of beef production. Hides are most commonly used for leather, which can be made into a variety of products, including shoes. In 2012 India was the world's largest producer of cattle hides.

Feral cattle
Feral cattle are defined as being 'cattle that are not domesticated or cultivated'. Populations of feral cattle are known to come from and exist in: Australia, United States of America, Colombia, Argentina, Spain, France and many islands, including New Guinea, Hawaii, Galapagos, Juan Fernández Islands, Hispaniola (Dominican Republic and Haiti), Tristan da Cunha and Île Amsterdam, two islands of Kuchinoshima and Kazura Island next to Naru Island in Japan. Chillingham cattle is sometimes regarded as a feral breed. Aleutian wild cattles can be found on Aleutian Islands. The "Kinmen cattle" which are dominantly found on Kinmen Island, Taiwan is mostly domesticated while smaller portion of the population is believed to live in the wild due to accidental releases.

Other notable examples include cattle in the vicinity of Hong Kong (in the Shing Mun Country Park, among Sai Kung District and Lantau Island and on Grass Island), and semi-feral animals in Yangmingshan, Taiwan.

Environmental impact

Gut flora in cattle include methanogens that produce methane as a byproduct of enteric fermentation, which cattle belch out. The same volume of atmospheric methane has a 72x higher (over 20 years) global warming potential than atmospheric carbon dioxide. Methane belching from cattle can be reduced with genetic selection, immunization against the many methanogens, rumen defaunation (killing the bacteria-killing protozoa), diet modification (e.g. seaweed fortification), decreased antibiotic use, and grazing management, among others.

A 2013 report from the Food and Agriculture Organization (FAO) based on 2005 data states that the livestock sector is responsible for 14.5% of greenhouse gas emissions, 65% of which is due to cattle. The IPCC estimates that cattle and other livestock emit about 80 to 93 Megatonnes of methane per year, accounting for an estimated 37% of anthropogenic methane emissions, and additional methane is produced by anaerobic fermentation of manure in manure lagoons and other manure storage structures. Another estimate is 12% of global GHG. While cattle fed forage actually produce more methane than grain-fed cattle, the increase may be offset by the increased carbon recapture of pastures, which recapture three times the CO2 of cropland used for grain.

One of the cited changes suggested to reduce greenhouse gas emissions is intensification of the livestock industry, since intensification leads to less land for a given level of production. This assertion is supported by studies of the US beef production system, suggesting practices prevailing in 2007 involved 8.6% less fossil fuel use, 16.3% less greenhouse gas emissions, 12.1% less water use, and 33.0% less land use, per unit mass of beef produced, than those used in 1977. The analysis took into account not only practices in feedlots, but also feed production (with less feed needed in more intensive production systems), forage-based cow-calf operations and back-grounding before cattle enter a feedlot (with more beef produced per head of cattle from those sources, in more intensive systems), and beef from animals derived from the dairy industry. A more controversial suggestion, advocated by George Monbiot in the documentary "Apocalypse Cow", is to stop farming cattle completely, however farmers often have political power so might be able to resist such a big change.

Significant numbers of dairy, as well as beef cattle, are confined in concentrated animal feeding operations (CAFOs), defined as "new and existing operations which stable or confine and feed or maintain for a total of 45 days or more in any 12-month period more than the number of animals specified" where "[c]rops, vegetation, forage growth, or post-harvest residues are not sustained in the normal growing season over any portion of the lot or facility." They may be designated as small, medium and large. Such designation of cattle CAFOs is according to cattle type (mature dairy cows, veal calves or other) and cattle numbers, but medium CAFOs are so designated only if they meet certain discharge criteria, and small CAFOs are designated only on a case-by-case basis.

A CAFO that discharges pollutants is required to obtain a permit, which requires a plan to manage nutrient runoff, manure, chemicals, contaminants, and other wastewater pursuant to the US Clean Water Act. The regulations involving CAFO permitting have been extensively litigated.
Commonly, CAFO wastewater and manure nutrients are applied to land at agronomic rates for use by forages or crops, and it is often assumed that various constituents of wastewater and manure, e.g. organic contaminants and pathogens, will be retained, inactivated or degraded on the land with application at such rates; however, additional evidence is needed to test reliability of such assumptions
. Concerns raised by opponents of CAFOs have included risks of contaminated water due to feedlot runoff, soil erosion, human and animal exposure to toxic chemicals, development of antibiotic resistant bacteria and an increase in E. coli contamination. While research suggests some of these impacts can be mitigated by developing wastewater treatment systems and planting cover crops in larger setback zones, the Union of Concerned Scientists released a report in 2008 concluding that CAFOs are generally unsustainable and externalize costs.

Another concern is manure, which if not well-managed, can lead to adverse environmental consequences. However, manure also is a valuable source of nutrients and organic matter when used as a fertilizer. Substitution of manure for synthetic fertilizers in crop production can be environmentally significant, as between 43 and 88 megajoules of fossil fuel energy would be used per kg of nitrogen in manufacture of synthetic nitrogenous fertilizers.

Grazing by cattle at low intensities can create a favourable environment for native herbs and forbs by mimicking the native grazers who they displaced; in many world regions, though, cattle are reducing biodiversity due to overgrazing. A survey of refuge managers on 123 National Wildlife Refuges in the US tallied 86 species of wildlife considered positively affected and 82 considered negatively affected by refuge cattle grazing or haying. Proper management of pastures, notably managed intensive rotational grazing and grazing at low intensities can lead to less use of fossil fuel energy, increased recapture of carbon dioxide, fewer ammonia emissions into the atmosphere, reduced soil erosion, better air quality, and less water pollution.

Health
The veterinary discipline dealing with cattle and cattle diseases (bovine veterinary) is called buiatrics. Veterinarians and professionals working on cattle health issues are pooled in the World Association for Buiatrics, founded in 1960. National associations and affiliates also exist.

Cattle diseases were in the center of attention in the 1980s and 1990s when the Bovine spongiform encephalopathy (BSE), also known as mad cow disease, was of concern. Cattle might catch and develop various other diseases, like blackleg, bluetongue, foot rot too.

In most states, as cattle health is not only a veterinarian issue, but also a public health issue, public health and food safety standards and farming regulations directly affect the daily work of farmers who keep cattle. However, said rules change frequently and are often debated. For instance, in the U.K., it was proposed in 2011 that milk from tuberculosis-infected cattle should be allowed to enter the food chain. Internal food safety regulations might affect a country's trade policy as well. For example, the United States has just reviewed its beef import rules according to the "mad cow standards"; while Mexico forbids the entry of cattle who are older than 30 months.

Cow urine is commonly used in India for internal medical purposes. It is distilled and then consumed by patients seeking treatment for a wide variety of illnesses. At present, no conclusive medical evidence shows this has any effect. However, an Indian medicine containing cow urine has already obtained U.S. patents.

Digital dermatitis is caused by the bacteria from the genus Treponema. It differs from foot rot and can appear under unsanitary conditions such as poor hygiene or inadequate hoof trimming, among other causes. It primarily affects dairy cattle and has been known to lower the quantity of milk produced, however the milk quality remains unaffected. Cattle are also susceptible to ringworm caused by the fungus, Trichophyton verrucosum, a contagious skin disease which may be transferred to humans exposed to infected cows.

Effect of high stocking density
Stocking density refers to the number of animals within a specified area. When stocking density reaches high levels, the behavioural needs of the animals may not be met. This can negatively influence health, welfare and production performance.

The effect of overstocking in cows can have a negative effect on milk production and reproduction rates which are two very important traits for dairy farmers. Overcrowding of cows in barns has been found to reduced feeding, resting and rumination. Although they consume the same amount of dry matter within the span of a day, they consume the food at a much more rapid rate, and this behaviour in cows can lead to further complications. The feeding behaviour of cows during their post-milking period is very important as it has been proven that the longer animals can eat after milking, the longer they will be standing up and therefore causing less contamination to the teat ends. This is necessary to reduce the risk of mastitis as infection has been shown to increase the chances of embryonic loss. Sufficient rest is important for dairy cows because it is during this period that their resting blood flow increases up to 50%, this is directly proportionate to milk production. Each additional hour of rest can be seen to translate to 2 to 3.5 more pounds of milk per cow daily. Stocking densities of anything over 120% have been shown to decrease the amount of time cows spend lying down.

Cortisol is an important stress hormone; its plasma concentrations increase greatly when subjected to high levels of stress. Increased concentration levels of cortisol have been associated with significant increases in gonadotrophin levels and lowered progestin levels. Reduction of stress is important in the reproductive state of cows as an increase in gonadotrophin and lowered progesterone levels may impinge on the ovulatory and lutenization process and to reduce the chances of successful implantation. A high cortisol level will also stimulate the degradation of fats and proteins which may make it difficult for the animal to sustain its pregnancy if implanted successfully.

Animal welfare concerns

Animal rights activists have criticized the treatment of cattle, claiming that common practices in cattle husbandry, slaughter and entertainment unnecessarily cause fear, stress, and pain. They advocate for abstaining from the consumption of cattle-related animal products and cattle-based entertainment.

Livestock industry
The following husbandry practices have been criticized by animal welfare and animal rights groups: branding, castration, dehorning, ear tagging, nose ringing, restraint, tail docking, the use of veal crates, and cattle prods. There are concerns that the stress and negative health impacts induced by high stocking density such as in concentrated animal feeding operations or feedlots, auctions, and during transport may be detrimental to their welfare, and has also been criticized.

The treatment of dairy cows faces additional criticism. To produce milk from dairy cattle, most calves are separated from their mothers soon after birth and fed milk replacement in order to retain the cows' milk for human consumption. Animal welfare advocates are critical of this practice, stating that this breaks the natural bond between the mother and her calf. The welfare of veal calves is also a concern. In order to continue lactation, dairy cows are bred every year, usually through artificial insemination. Because of this, some individuals have posited that dairy production is based on the sexual exploitation of cows. Although the natural life expectancy of cattle could be as much as twenty years, after about five years, a cow's milk production has dropped; at which point most dairy cows are sent to slaughter.

Leather
While leather is often a by-product of slaughter, in some countries, such as India and Bangladesh, cows are raised primarily for their leather. These leather industries often make their cows walk long distances across borders to be killed in neighboring provinces and countries where cattle slaughter is legal. Some cows die along the long journey, and sometimes exhausted animals are abused to keep them moving. These practices have faced backlash from various animal rights groups.

Sport
Animal treatment in rodeo is targeted most often at bull riding but also calf roping and steer roping, with the opposition saying that rodeos are unnecessary and cause stress, injury, and death to the animals. In Spain, the Running of the bulls faces opposition due to the stress and injuries incurred by the bulls during the event. Bullfighting is opposed as a blood sport in which bulls are forced to suffer severe stress and death.

Oxen

Oxen (singular ox) are cattle trained as draft animals. Often they are adult, castrated males of larger breeds, although females and bulls are also used in some areas. Usually, an ox is over four years old due to the need for training and to allow it to grow to full size. Oxen are used for plowing, transport, hauling cargo, grain-grinding by trampling or by powering machines, irrigation by powering pumps, and wagon drawing. Oxen were commonly used to skid logs in forests, and sometimes still are, in low-impact, select-cut logging. Oxen are most often used in teams of two, paired, for light work such as carting, with additional pairs added when more power is required, sometimes up to a total of 20 or more.
Oxen can be trained to respond to a teamster's signals. These signals are given by verbal commands or by noise (whip cracks). Verbal commands vary according to dialect and local tradition. Oxen can pull harder and longer than horses. Though not as fast as horses, they are less prone to injury because they are more sure-footed.

Many oxen are used worldwide, especially in developing countries. About 11.3 million draft oxen are used in sub-Saharan Africa. In India, the number of draft cattle in 1998 was estimated at 65.7 million head. About half the world's crop production is thought to depend on land preparation (such as plowing) made possible by animal traction.

Religion, traditions and folklore

Islamic traditions

The cow is mentioned often in the Quran. The second and longest surah of the Quran is named Al-Baqara ("The Cow"). Out of the 286 verses of the surah, seven mention cows (Al Baqarah 67–73). The name of the surah derives from this passage in which Moses orders his people to sacrifice a cow in order to resurrect a man murdered by an unknown person.

Hindu traditions
Veneration of the cow has become a symbol of the identity of Hindus as a community, especially since the end of the 19th century. Slaughter of cows (including oxen, bulls and calves) is forbidden by law in several states of the Indian Union. McDonald's outlets in India do not serve any beef burgers. In Maharaja Ranjit Singh's empire of the early 19th century, the killing of a cow was punishable by death.

Other traditions

 The Evangelist St. Luke is depicted as an ox in Christian art.
 In Judaism, as described in Numbers 19:2, the ashes of a sacrificed unblemished red heifer that has never been yoked can be used for ritual purification of people who came into contact with a corpse.
 The ox is one of the 12-year cycle of animals which appear in the Chinese zodiac related to the Chinese calendar. See: Ox (Zodiac).
 The constellation Taurus represents a bull.
 An apocryphal story has it that a cow started the Great Chicago Fire by kicking over a kerosene lamp. Michael Ahern, the reporter who created the cow story, admitted in 1893 that he had fabricated it for more colorful copy.
 On 18 February 1930, Elm Farm Ollie became the first cow to fly in an airplane and also the first cow to be milked in an airplane.
 The first known law requiring branding in North America was enacted on 5 February 1644, by Connecticut. It said that all cattle and pigs had to have a registered brand or earmark by 1 May 1644.
 The  is a traditional toy from the Aizu region of Japan that is thought to ward off illness.
 The case of Sherwood v. Walker—involving a supposedly barren heifer that was actually pregnant—first enunciated the concept of mutual mistake as a means of destroying the meeting of the minds in contract law. 
 The Fulani of West Africa are the world's largest nomadic cattle-herders.
 The Maasai tribe of East Africa traditionally believe their god Engai entitled them to divine rights to the ownership of all cattle on earth.

In heraldry
Cattle are typically represented in heraldry by the bull.

Population
The cattle population of Britain rose from 9.8 million in 1878 to 11.7 million in 1908, but beef consumption rose much faster. Britain became the "stud farm of the world" exporting livestock to countries where there were no indigenous cattle. In 1929 80% of the meat trade of the world was products of what were originally English breeds. There were nearly 70 million cattle in the US by the early 1930s.

For 2013, the FAO estimated global cattle numbers at 1.47 billion. Regionally, the FAO estimate for 2013 includes: Asia 497 million; South America 350 million; Africa 307 million; Europe 122 million; North America 102 million; Central America 47 million; Oceania 40 million; and Caribbean 9 million.

As per FAS/USDA 2021 data, India had the largest cattle inventory in the world in 2021 followed by Brazil and China

India's cattle's inventory was reported at 305.5 million head in 2021, accounting for roughly 30% of the world's inventory.
India, Brazil and China accounted for roughly 65% of the world's cattle inventory in 2021.

It has been estimated that out of all animal species on Earth, Bos taurus has the largest biomass at roughly 400 million tonnes, followed closely by Euphausia superba (Antarctic krill) at 379 million tonnes, and Homo sapiens (humans) at 373 million tonnes.

See also

 1966 anti-cow slaughter agitation
 :Category:Individual cattle
 British Cattle Health Initiative
 Bull-baiting
 Bullocky
 Bulls and Cows (game)
 Cattle age determination
 Cowboy
 Intensive animal farming
 List of cattle breeds
 List of domesticated animals

References

Further reading

 Bhattacharya, S. 2003. Cattle ownership makes it a man's world . Newscientist.com. Retrieved 26 December 2006.
 Cattle Today (CT). 2006. Website. Breeds of cattle. Cattle Today. Retrieved 26 December 2006
 Clay, J. 2004. World Agriculture and the Environment: A Commodity-by-Commodity Guide to Impacts and Practices. Washington, DC: Island Press. .
 Clutton-Brock, J. 1999. A Natural History of Domesticated Mammals. Cambridge: Cambridge University Press. .
 Huffman, B. 2006. The ultimate ungulate page. UltimateUngulate.com. Retrieved 26 December 2006.
 Invasive Species Specialist Group (ISSG). 2005. Bos taurus. Global Invasive Species Database.
 Johns, Catherine. 2011 Cattle: History, Myth, Art. London: The British Museum Press. 978-0-7141-5084-0
 Nowak, R.M. and Paradiso, J.L. 1983. Walker's Mammals of the World. Baltimore, MD: The Johns Hopkins University Press. 
 Oklahoma State University (OSU). 2006. Breeds of Cattle. Retrieved 5 January 2007.
 Public Broadcasting Service (PBS). 2004. Holy cow . PBS Nature. Retrieved 5 January 2007.
  – A visual textbook containing History/Origin, Phenotype & Statistics of 45 breeds.
 Rath, S. 1998. The Complete Cow. Stillwater, MN: Voyageur Press. .
 Raudiansky, S. 1992. The Covenant of the Wild. New York: William Morrow and Company, Inc. .
 Spectrum Commodities (SC). 2006. Live cattle. Spectrumcommodities.com. Retrieved 5 January 2007.
 Voelker, W. 1986. The Natural History of Living Mammals. Medford, NJ: Plexus Publishing, Inc. .
 Yogananda, P. 1946. The Autobiography of a Yogi. Los Angeles: Self Realization Fellowship. .

 
Mammals described in 1758
Herbivorous mammals
Articles containing video clips
Taxa named by Carl Linnaeus
Cosmopolitan mammals